Sheborg Massacre is 2016 Australian neo-pulp film written and directed by Daniel Armstrong and starring Daisy Masterman, Whitney Duff, and Emma-Louise Wilson.

Premise
When an alien fugitive crash lands into a local puppy farm and begins turning people into machines that feed on puppy flesh, Dylan and her BFF Eddie have to decide whether or not to take on the SheBorg menace, and save the world.

Cast

Production
Armstrong describes Sheborg Massacre as a neo-pulp film.
"Neo-pulp lovingly embraces the most extreme, cliche, and supercilious elements of pop culture and pulp literature and puts them in a human context. SHEBORG MASSACRE itself is a 50s teen rebel flick set in a B grade sci-fi world from the early 80s, with horror style violence. It’s not a spoof, it’s not horror, it’s not action, it’s not sci-fi, it’s not drama. It’s all of these things. It’s neo-pulp."

Sheborg Massacre was produced by Melbourne-based production company Strongman Pictures Entertainment, and written, directed and edited by Daniel Armstrong. Armstrong's previous films include the international cult hit MurderDrome - the world's first roller derby horror movie, which hit a chord with alternative cinema fans worldwide, and the wrestle-ploitation film From Parts Unknown: Fight Like A Girl.

History
Allegedly inspired by true events, the feature film Sheborg Massacre began production mid 2015. Most of the filming took place at a property in Melton, Victoria. With an estimated budget of $20,000 the cast and crew completed the project over the space of 33 weekends and an unknown number of evening shoots.

Accolades

References

External links
 

2016 films
Alien invasions in films
Australian science fiction horror films
2016 horror films
Australian action adventure films
Australian comedy horror films
2010s English-language films
2010s Australian films